Alpha Manager is a quantitative rating system designed by Trustnet.com to rate fund managers of unit trusts and OEICs.

The first ratings were launched in March 2009 and are re-evaluated every January to account for any changes in performance that may have occurred throughout the year.

The rating is based on three components:

 Risk-adjusted alpha
 Outperformance of a benchmark
 Consistency of outperformance or underperformance in rising and falling markets

Only 10% of registered fund managers are awarded this rating and must show consistent outperformance of their peer groups for at least 30 months.

References

External links
 Knowledge on Alpha Manager

Money managers